Pierre Alcover (14 March 1893 – 14 November 1957) was a French stage and film actor.

He starred in 40 films between 1918 and 1943.

In 1920 he starred in the film Champi-Tortu. One of his most notable performances was in Marcel L'Herbier's 1928 film L'Argent, as the corrupt banker Saccard.
 
He was the second husband of the film actress Gabrielle Colonna-Romano, and they are buried together in the cimetière de Rueil-Malmaison.

Selected filmography
 Marion Delorme (1918)
 L'Hirondelle et la Mésange (1920)
 En plongée (1926)
 L'Argent (1928)
 La Petite Lise (Little Lise) (1930)
 Le Mariage de Mlle Beulemans (The Marriage of Mademoiselle Beulemans) (1932)
 Criminal (1933)
 Deuxième bureau (Second Bureau) (1935)
 La Citadelle du silence (The Citadel of Silence) (1937)
 Un carnet de bal (Life Dances On) (1937)
 Le Messager (The Messenger) (1937)
 L'Homme de nulle part (The Man from Nowhere) (1937)
 La Rue sans joie (Street Without Joy) (1938)
 Nights of Princes (1938)
 Ernest the Rebel (1938)
 Le Colonel Chabert (1943)

External links 

1893 births
1957 deaths
French male film actors
French male silent film actors
20th-century French male actors
Troupe of the Comédie-Française